Orekhovo is a rural locality (a village) in Tolpukhovskoye Rural Settlement, Sobinsky District, Vladimir Oblast, Russia. The population was 16 as of 2010. There are 4 streets.

Geography 
Orekhovo is located on the Vezhbolovka River, 28 km north of Sobinka (the district's administrative centre) by road. Novino is the nearest rural locality.

References 

Rural localities in Sobinsky District